Pingasa angulifera is a moth of the family Geometridae first described by William Warren in 1896. It is found in Queensland, Australia.

Adults have mottled green wings, with two dark zigzag lines on the forewings and one on the hindwings. Furthermore, there is a broad submarginal brown band on each wing.

References

Moths described in 1896
Pseudoterpnini